Keru Kola or Karu Kola may refer to:
 Bala Keru Kola
 Pain Karu Kola